Zolkifly bin Mohd Lazim is a Malaysian politician from BERSATU. He was the Member of Penang State Legislative Assembly for Telok Bahang since 2018 until 2023.

Politics 
He was a member of PAS and PASMA, and was appointed as the Chairman of PASMA Penang before joining BERSATU. He is also the Chief of BERSATU Telok Bahang and Balik Pulau branch.

Election results

External links

References 

Malaysian United Indigenous Party politicians
Malaysian Islamic Party politicians
Members of the Penang State Legislative Assembly
Malaysian people of Malay descent
Living people
1964 births